Madonna and Child can refer to:

 Madonna (art)
 Madonna and Child (Bellini, Detroit)
 Madonna and Child (Bellini, Milan, 1460–1465)
 Madonna and Child (Bellini, Milan, 1510)
 Madonna and Child (Bellini, New York, 1485–1490)
 Madonna and Child (Bellini, Pavia)
 Madonna and Child (Bellini, Rome)
 Madonna and Child (Bellini, Venice, 1475)
 Madonna and Child (Bellini, Verona)
 Madonna and Child (Botticelli, Avignon)
 Madonna and Child (Cima) (disambiguation)
 Madonna and Child (Correggio, Vienna)
 Madonna and Child (Donatello, Louvre)
 Madonna and Child (Duccio)
 Madonna and Child (van Dyck)
 Madonna and Child (Gentile da Fabriano)
 Madonna and Child (Artemisia Gentileschi)
 Madonna and Child (Lippi)
 Madonna and Child (Filippo Lippi, Parma)
 Madonna and Child (Mantegna, Bergamo)
 Madonna and Child (Perugino)
 Madonna and Child (Raphael)
 Madonna and Child (Schiavone)
 Madonna and Child (Francesco Solimena)
 Madonna and Child (Umlauf)

See also
 Madonna and Child with Saints (disambiguation)
 Virgin and Child (disambiguation)
 Madonna (disambiguation)